Una de zombis is a 2003 Spanish film.

Cast 
Miguel Ángel Aijón - Aijón
Miguel Ángel Aparicio - Caspas
Mayte Navales - Carla
Nacho Rubio - El Duende
Salomé Jiménez - La Puños
Santiago Segura - Padre Pelayo/Entrecot/Himself
Raúl Sanz - Johhny Maldad
Natalia Moreno - Luchi
Marianico el Corto - Padre de Aijón
Pedro Rebollo - Rumor

See also 
Night of the Living Dead

External links 
 
 
 

2003 films
2003 horror films
Spanish independent films
Spanish zombie films
2003 comedy horror films
2000s Spanish-language films
Spanish comedy horror films
2003 independent films
2000s Spanish films